The 1907 Auburn Tigers football team represented Alabama Polytechnic Institute (now known Auburn University) in the 1907 Southern Intercollegiate Athletic Association football season.  Coached by Willis Kienholz, Auburn recorded a 6–2–1 record in its 16th season of intercollegiate football.  The Tigers averaged 26.4 points per game on offense and gave up only 4.3 points per game.

1907 was the last season before a 40-year hiatus in the Iron Bowl series between Auburn and Alabama.  The two teams did not meet on the gridiron from 1908 to 1947.

Schedule

References

Auburn
Auburn Tigers football seasons
Auburn Tigers football